The Beat Room is a British television series presenting beat, rhythm and blues and other pop music, shown on BBC2 in 1964–65.

Production
The series was produced by Barry Langford and directed by James Moir. Acts, introduced by an off-screen presenter, Pat Campbell, performed live before an audience.  The resident house band was initially Wayne Gibson and the Dynamic Sounds, but was replaced by Peter and the Headlines mid-run. The show also featured a sextet of female performance dancers, the Beat Girls formed from an existing group, the Katy-Dids.  In all, 29 programmes were made.

The first show, broadcast on Monday 6 July 1964 at 6.35 p.m., featured The Animals, Lulu & the Luvvers, and Millie Small. The show was broadcast on Mondays, with Saturday repeats during the middle of the run. The final show was shown on 29 January 1965.

There was a 75-minute New Year's Eve special in 1964, Beat in the New.

Tapes of all but one of the programmes were later destroyed.  The only remaining programme (originally broadcast on 5 October 1964) held by the BBC featured Tom Jones, Julie Rogers, The Kinks, John Lee Hooker, and The Syndicats. This was repeated on BBC4 in 2007.

The following episode listing is based on Radio Times information

The Beat Girls
The Beat Girls were choreographed by Gary Cockrell and co-managed by Cockrell and Valerie Hyman. They are most famous today for providing most of the dancers who formed Pan's People though most joined after the Beat Room period. They were based out of the Dance Centre.

The line-up from July to October 1964 was:

 Ann Chapman
 Babs Lord
 Jo Cook
 Jenny Ferle
 Lynn Wolseley
 Ruth Pearson

This line-up is seen on the remaining publicly available footage of the Beat Girls on the Beat Room performing to Whole Lotta Shakin' Goin' On

They also appeared in the film Gonks Go Beat.

Jo Cook's period in the group ended in October 1964 due to an allegation of already being under contract; however by the following month she had formed the Go-Jos for Top of the Pops, winning the work ahead of the Beat Girls. Carlotta Barrow replaced her as a regular member having already done some performances in the group.

Replacement programme

The programme was replaced in its same BBC2 timeslot by Gadzooks!, named after Carlotta 'Zooks' Barrow from the Beat Girls. The show was again produced by Barry Langford with the Beat Girls also appearing as part of the main line-up every week. The series underwent three name changes during its 7 months on the air:

Gadzooks! It's All Happening  1 February 1965 - 24 May 1965

Gadzooks! It's The in Crowd  31 May 1965 - 5 July 1965

Gadzooks! 12 July 1965 - 27 September 1965

The Beat Girls after the Beat Room
The group had several distinct lineups in its remaining history:

January 1965-August 1965 - Gadzooks
Performing on the weekly Gadzooks shows with the later Beat Room line-up.

October 1965-December 1966 - UK and Dutch TV programmes

The Gadzooks programmes finished in August 1965, and the group ceased to appear on a regular UK music programme. Carlotta Barrow quit the group to appear in films and then film set design.

In October 1965, the Beat Girls start appearing on a new Dutch AVRO show, Moef Ga Ga.

In early 1966, several of the original dancers quit. Ann Chapman first went into films and later joined the Dougie Squires' Young Generation, following him into the Second Generation.  Ruth Pearson, Lyn Wolseley and Jenny Ferne left and formed a new group, Tomorrow's People which, as well as working in the UK, appeared on Aaah-Dele in the Netherlands.

Several new dancers joined. Flick Colby joined in January 1966, followed by Dee Dee Wilde in March, and Lorelly Harris and Penny Fergusson in May.

The lineup by mid-1966 was:

 Flick Colby
 Diane South
 Dee Dee Wilde
 Lorelly Harris
 Penny Fergusson
 Babs Lord

An AVRO Dutch programme, 'Felicity', based around Flick Colby was made in May and shown on 6 September 1966. This was an entrant to the Munich film festival.

The appeared on the ATV Dickie Valentine show in July–August 1966. Lesley Judd also appeared in this programme.

However the Dutch performances led to a dispute over wages and allowances for the UK-based dancers, and in December 1966, all the dancers except South quit, forming Pan's People.

January 1967-May 1968 - Dutch TV programmes

Following the walk-out of the now Pan's People dancers, six Dutch dancers are recruited in open auditions, and with Diane South as both dancer and choreographer, the group continued to appear on Dutch TV shows.

The original lineup in January 1967 was:

 Anke Luthart
 Hannah de Leeuwe
 Elsa Voelker
 Rita Gardeslen
 Rosa Ebbeling
 Linda Kraay
 Diane South

In January 68 Penney de Jager joined the group.

Moef Ga Ga ended in May 1968, to be succeeded by Toppop with Penney de Jager as choreographer. The Dutch Beat Girls also ended with Moef Ga Ga.

January 1967-July 1968 - UK appearances

A different UK-based line up, with Diane South also appearing, occasionally did performances including a BBC show with Jimmy Tarbuck and with Bob Monkhouse. The Bob Monkhouse performers were:

 Mandy Rawlings
 Diane South
 Alison Minto
 Maggie Vincent

References

External links
 BBC Genome
 One for the Dads - covers dance troupes including the Beat Girls

Pop music television series
1964 British television series debuts
1965 British television series endings
1960s British music television series
BBC Television shows
English-language television shows